Scott Driscoll is a politician and businessman.

Scott Driscoll may also refer to:

Scott Driscoll (linesman), Canadian hockey linesman
Scott Driscoll (figure skater) in 1984 United States Figure Skating Championships